Rohr is a commune in the Bas-Rhin department in Grand Est in north-eastern France.

Between 1 February 1973 and 1 January 1986 Rohr was merged with Gougenheim.

See also
 Communes of the Bas-Rhin department
 Kochersberg

References

Communes of Bas-Rhin